The 1995 Women's African Volleyball Championship was the Seventh Edition African continental volleyball Championship for women in Africa and it was held in Tunis, Tunisia, with six teams participated.

Teams

Final ranking

References

1995 Women
African championship, Women
Women's African Volleyball Championship
International volleyball competitions hosted by Kenya